The 2023 Texas Rangers season will be the 63rd of the Texas Rangers franchise overall, their 52nd in Arlington as the Rangers, and the 4th season at Globe Life Field.

Offseason 
The Rangers finished the 2022 season 68–94, an improvement on their 2021 record of 60–102. They finished 38 games out of 1st and missed the postseason for the sixth consecutive season.

On October 21, 2022, the Rangers hired Bruce Bochy to be their manager for the 2023 season.

Rule changes 
Pursuant to the CBA, new rule changes will be in place for the 2023 season:

 institution of a pitch clock between pitches;
 limits on pickoff attempts per plate appearance;
 limits on defensive shifts requiring two infielders to be on either side of second and be within the boundary of the infield; and
 larger bases (increased to 18-inch squares);

Regular season

Game log

|- style="background: 
| 1 || March 30 || Phillies || – || || || — || || – ||
|- style="background: 
| 2 || April 1 || Phillies || – || || || — || || – ||
|- style="background: 
| 3 || April 2 || Phillies || – || || || — || || – ||
|- style="background: 
| 4 || April 3 || Orioles || – || || || — || || – ||
|- style="background: 
| 5 || April 4 || Orioles || – || || || — || || – ||
|- style="background: 
| 6 || April 5 || Orioles || – || || || — || || – ||
|- style="background: 
| 7 || April 7 || @ Cubs || – || || || — || || – ||
|- style="background: 
| 8 || April 8 || @ Cubs || – || || || — || || – ||
|- style="background: 
| 9 || April 9 || @ Cubs || – || || || — || || – ||
|- style="background: 
| 10 || April 10 || Royals || – || || || — || || – ||
|- style="background: 
| 11 || April 11 || Royals || – || || || — || || – ||
|- style="background: 
| 12 || April 12 || Royals || – || || || — || || – ||
|- style="background: 
| 13 || April 14 || @ Astros || – || || || — || || – ||
|- style="background: 
| 14 || April 15 || @ Astros || – || || || — || || – ||
|- style="background: 
| 15 || April 16 || @ Astros || – || || || — || || – ||
|- style="background: 
| 16 || April 17 || @ Royals || – || || || — || || – ||
|- style="background: 
| 17 || April 18 || @ Royals || – || || || — || || – ||
|- style="background: 
| 18 || April 19 || @ Royals || – || || || — || || – ||
|- style="background: 
| 19 || April 21 || Athletics || – || || || — || || – ||
|- style="background: 
| 20 || April 22 || Athletics || – || || || — || || – ||
|- style="background: 
| 21 || April 23 || Athletics || – || || || — || || – ||
|- style="background: 
| 22 || April 24 || @ Reds || – || || || — || || – ||
|- style="background: 
| 23 || April 25 || @ Reds || – || || || — || || – ||
|- style="background: 
| 24 || April 26 || @ Reds || – || || || — || || – ||
|- style="background: 
| 25 || April 27 || Yankees || – || || || — || || – ||
|- style="background: 
| 26 || April 28 || Yankees || – || || || — || || – ||
|- style="background: 
| 27 || April 29 || Yankees || – || || || — || || – ||
|- style="background: 
| 28 || April 30 || Yankees || – || || || — || || – ||
|- 
 

|- style="background: 
| 29 || May 2 || Diamondbacks || – || || || — || || – ||
|- style="background: 
| 30 || May 3 || Diamondbacks || – || || || — || || – ||
|- style="background: 
| 31 || May 5 || @ Angels || – || || || — || || – ||
|- style="background: 
| 32 || May 6 || @ Angels || – || || || — || || – ||
|- style="background: 
| 33 || May 7 || @ Angels || – || || || — || || – ||
|- style="background: 
| 34 || May 8 || @ Mariners || – || || || — || || – ||
|- style="background: 
| 35 || May 9 || @ Mariners || – || || || — || || – ||
|- style="background: 
| 36 || May 10 || @ Mariners || – || || || — || || – ||
|- style="background: 
| 37 || May 11 || @ Athletics || – || || || — || || – ||
|- style="background: 
| 38 || May 12 || @ Athletics || – || || || — || || – ||
|- style="background: 
| 39 || May 13 || @ Athletics || – || || || — || || – ||
|- style="background: 
| 40 || May 14 || @ Athletics || – || || || — || || – ||
|- style="background: 
| 41 || May 15 || Braves || – || || || — || || – ||
|- style="background: 
| 42 || May 16 || Braves || – || || || — || || – ||
|- style="background: 
| 43 || May 17 || Braves || – || || || — || || – ||
|- style="background: 
| 44 || May 19 || Rockies || – || || || — || || – ||
|- style="background: 
| 45 || May 20 || Rockies || – || || || — || || – ||
|- style="background: 
| 46 || May 21 || Rockies || – || || || — || || – ||
|- style="background: 
| 47 || May 22 || @ Pirates || – || || || — || || – ||
|- style="background: 
| 48 || May 23 || @ Pirates || – || || || — || || – ||
|- style="background: 
| 49 || May 24 || @ Pirates || – || || || — || || – ||
|- style="background: 
| 50 || May 26 || @ Orioles || – || || || — || || – ||
|- style="background: 
| 51 || May 27 || @ Orioles || – || || || — || || – ||
|- style="background: 
| 52 || May 28 || @ Orioles || – || || || — || || – ||
|- style="background: 
| 53 || May 29 || @ Tigers || – || || || — || || – ||
|- style="background: 
| 54 || May 30 || @ Tigers || – || || || — || || – ||
|- style="background: 
| 55 || May 31 || @ Tigers || – || || || — || || – ||
|- 
 

|- style="background: 
| 56 || June 2 || Mariners || – || || || — || || – ||
|- style="background: 
| 57 || June 3 || Mariners || – || || || — || || – ||
|- style="background: 
| 58 || June 4 || Mariners || – || || || — || || – ||
|- style="background: 
| 59 || June 5 || Cardinals || – || || || — || || – ||
|- style="background: 
| 60 || June 6 || Cardinals || – || || || — || || – ||
|- style="background: 
| 61 || June 7 || Cardinals || – || || || — || || – ||
|- style="background: 
| 62 || June 9 || @ Rays || – || || || — || || – ||
|- style="background: 
| 63 || June 10 || @ Rays || – || || || — || || – ||
|- style="background: 
| 64 || June 11 || @ Rays || – || || || — || || – ||
|- style="background: 
| 65 || June 12 || Angels || – || || || — || || – ||
|- style="background: 
| 66 || June 13 || Angels || – || || || — || || – ||
|- style="background: 
| 67 || June 14 || Angels || – || || || — || || – ||
|- style="background: 
| 68 || June 15 || Angels || – || || || — || || – ||
|- style="background: 
| 69 || June 16 || Blue Jays || – || || || — || || – ||
|- style="background: 
| 70 || June 17 || Blue Jays || – || || || — || || – ||
|- style="background: 
| 71 || June 18 || Blue Jays || – || || || — || || – ||
|- style="background: 
| 72 || June 19 || @ White Sox || – || || || — || || – ||
|- style="background: 
| 73 || June 20 || @ White Sox || – || || || — || || – ||
|- style="background: 
| 74 || June 21 || @ White Sox || – || || || — || || – ||
|- style="background: 
| 75 || June 23 || @ Yankees || – || || || — || || – ||
|- style="background: 
| 76 || June 24 || @ Yankees || – || || || — || || – ||
|- style="background: 
| 77 || June 25 || @ Yankees || – || || || — || || – ||
|- style="background: 
| 78 || June 26 || Tigers || – || || || — || || – ||
|- style="background: 
| 79 || June 27 || Tigers || – || || || — || || – ||
|- style="background: 
| 80 || June 28 || Tigers || – || || || — || || – ||
|- style="background: 
| 81 || June 29 || Tigers || – || || || — || || – ||
|- style="background: 
| 82 || June 30 || Astros || – || || || — || || – ||
|- 
 

|- style="background: 
| 83 || July 1 || Astros || – || || || — || || – ||
|- style="background: 
| 84 || July 2 || Astros || – || || || — || || – ||
|- style="background: 
| 85 || July 3 || Astros || – || || || — || || – ||
|- style="background: 
| 86 || July 4 || @ Red Sox || – || || || — || || – ||
|- style="background: 
| 87 || July 5 || @ Red Sox || – || || || — || || – ||
|- style="background: 
| 88 || July 6 || @ Red Sox || – || || || — || || – ||
|- style="background: 
| 89 || July 7 || @ Nationals || – || || || — || || – ||
|- style="background: 
| 90 || July 8 || @ Nationals || – || || || — || || – ||
|- style="background: 
| 91 || July 9 || @ Nationals || – || || || — || || – ||
|- style="text-align:center; background:#bbcaff;"
| colspan="11" | 93rd All-Star Game: Seattle, WA
|- style="background: 
| 92 || July 14 || Guardians || – || || || — || || – ||
|- style="background: 
| 93 || July 15 || Guardians || – || || || — || || – ||
|- style="background: 
| 94 || July 16 || Guardians || – || || || — || || – ||
|- style="background: 
| 95 || July 17 || Rays || – || || || — || || – ||
|- style="background: 
| 96 || July 18 || Rays || – || || || — || || – ||
|- style="background: 
| 97 || July 19 || Rays || – || || || — || || – ||
|- style="background: 
| 98 || July 21 || Dodgers || – || || || — || || – ||
|- style="background: 
| 99 || July 22 || Dodgers || – || || || — || || – ||
|- style="background: 
| 100 || July 23 || Dodgers || – || || || — || || – ||
|- style="background: 
| 101 || July 24 || @ Astros || – || || || — || || – ||
|- style="background: 
| 102 || July 25 || @ Astros || – || || || — || || – ||
|- style="background: 
| 103 || July 26 || @ Astros || – || || || — || || – ||
|- style="background: 
| 104 || July 28 || @ Padres || – || || || — || || – ||
|- style="background: 
| 105 || July 29 || @ Padres || – || || || — || || – ||
|- style="background: 
| 106 || July 30 || @ Padres || – || || || — || || – ||
|- 
 

|- style="background: 
| 107 || August 1 || White Sox || – || || || — || || – ||
|- style="background: 
| 108 || August 2 || White Sox || – || || || — || || – ||
|- style="background: 
| 109 || August 3 || White Sox || – || || || — || || – ||
|- style="background: 
| 110 || August 4 || Marlins || – || || || — || || – ||
|- style="background: 
| 111 || August 5 || Marlins || – || || || — || || – ||
|- style="background: 
| 112 || August 6 || Marlins || – || || || — || || – ||
|- style="background: 
| 113 || August 7 || @ Athletics || – || || || — || || – ||
|- style="background: 
| 114 || August 8 || @ Athletics || – || || || — || || – ||
|- style="background: 
| 115 || August 9 || @ Athletics || – || || || — || || – ||
|- style="background: 
| 116 || August 11 || @ Giants || – || || || — || || – ||
|- style="background: 
| 117 || August 12 || @ Giants || – || || || — || || – ||
|- style="background: 
| 118 || August 13 || @ Giants || – || || || — || || – ||
|- style="background: 
| 119 || August 14 || Angels || – || || || — || || – ||
|- style="background: 
| 120 || August 15 || Angels || – || || || — || || – ||
|- style="background: 
| 121 || August 16 || Angels || – || || || — || || – ||
|- style="background: 
| 122 || August 18 || Brewers || – || || || — || || – ||
|- style="background: 
| 123 || August 19 || Brewers || – || || || — || || – ||
|- style="background: 
| 124 || August 20 || Brewers || – || || || — || || – ||
|- style="background: 
| 125 || August 21 || @ Diamondbacks || – || || || — || || – ||
|- style="background: 
| 126 || August 22 || @ Diamondbacks || – || || || — || || – ||
|- style="background: 
| 127 || August 24 || @ Twins || – || || || — || || – ||
|- style="background: 
| 128 || August 25 || @ Twins || – || || || — || || – ||
|- style="background: 
| 129 || August 26 || @ Twins || – || || || — || || – ||
|- style="background: 
| 130 || August 27 || @ Twins || – || || || — || || – ||
|- style="background: 
| 131 || August 28 || @ Mets || – || || || — || || – ||
|- style="background: 
| 132 || August 29 || @ Mets || – || || || — || || – ||
|- style="background: 
| 133 || August 30 || @ Mets || – || || || — || || – ||
|- 
 

|- style="background: 
| 134 || September 1 || Twins || – || || || — || || – ||
|- style="background: 
| 135 || September 2 || Twins || – || || || — || || – ||
|- style="background: 
| 136 || September 3 || Twins || – || || || — || || – ||
|- style="background: 
| 137 || September 4 || Astros || – || || || — || || – ||
|- style="background: 
| 138 || September 5 || Astros || – || || || — || || – ||
|- style="background: 
| 139 || September 6 || Astros || – || || || — || || – ||
|- style="background: 
| 140 || September 8 || Athletics || – || || || — || || – ||
|- style="background: 
| 141 || September 9 || Athletics || – || || || — || || – ||
|- style="background: 
| 142 || September 10 || Athletics || – || || || — || || – ||
|- style="background: 
| 143 || September 11 || @ Blue Jays || – || || || — || || – ||
|- style="background: 
| 144 || September 12 || @ Blue Jays || – || || || — || || – ||
|- style="background: 
| 145 || September 13 || @ Blue Jays || – || || || — || || – ||
|- style="background: 
| 146 || September 14 || @ Blue Jays || – || || || — || || – ||
|- style="background: 
| 147 || September 15 || @ Guardians || – || || || — || || – ||
|- style="background: 
| 148 || September 16 || @ Guardians || – || || || — || || – ||
|- style="background: 
| 149 || September 17 || @ Guardians || – || || || — || || – ||
|- style="background: 
| 150 || September 18 || Red Sox || – || || || — || || – ||
|- style="background: 
| 151 || September 19 || Red Sox || – || || || — || || – ||
|- style="background: 
| 152 || September 20 || Red Sox || – || || || — || || – ||
|- style="background: 
| 153 || September 22 || Mariners || – || || || — || || – ||
|- style="background: 
| 154 || September 23 || Mariners || – || || || — || || – ||
|- style="background: 
| 155 || September 24 || Mariners || – || || || — || || – ||
|- style="background: 
| 156 || September 25 || @ Angels || – || || || — || || – ||
|- style="background: 
| 157 || September 26 || @ Angels || – || || || — || || – ||
|- style="background: 
| 158 || September 27 || @ Angels || – || || || — || || – ||
|- style="background: 
| 159 || September 28 || @ Mariners || – || || || — || || – ||
|- style="background: 
| 160 || September 29 || @ Mariners || – || || || — || || – ||
|- style="background: 
| 161 || September 30 || @ Mariners || – || || || — || || – ||
|- style="background: 
| 162 || October 1 || @ Mariners || – || || || — || || – ||
|-

American League West

American League Wild Card

Current roster

Farm system

References

External links
 2023 Texas Rangers season at Baseball-Reference.com
 2023 Texas Rangers fullseason schedule and
 Statistics

Texas Rangers seasons
Texas Rangers
Texas Rangers